Vigna hosei, also known as the sarowak bean, is a perennial legume that grows in low-lying, humid, tropical areas but more commonly disturbed or roadside areas.

Description

Vigna hosei is a twining or creeping legume, often forming a thick ground cover. Its leaflets are ovate to elliptic, with thin, long hairs on both sides.

These other flowers in a ripe state are very yellow, finely and quite densely pubescent, and have one to two seeds.

Habitat and ecology

Vigna hosei is native to Taiwan, Indonesia, and Malaysia in tropical southeast Asia. It is also widely cultivated and has become naturalized in tropical Africa (Kenya, Tanzania, Rwanda, Mozambique, and Madagascar), Australia, the US states of Florida and Hawaii, and in the Caribbean.

It requires  of annual rainfall, and due to its shallow root system it can withstand flooding but not drought. One of its most outstanding characteristics is its persistence under shade, but full sunlight is required for good seed production. It can grow in a wide range of soils but prefers acidic soils of pH 4.9 or less.

As a cover crop, Vigna hosei is susceptible to the fungus disease Rhizoctonia solani, which causes wilting of large patches of leaves. Wet weather favors the spread of the disease. Vigna hosei is also one of many plants able to be infected by the cucumber mosaic virus.

Uses

Vigna hosei is used as a green manure and ground cover crop in young tree plantations as well as in rubber, tea, and coconut plantations. Its seedling growth is vigorous, and young plants quickly suppress weed growth, forming a thick mat of growth with a dense leaf litter, which protects the soil from erosion and prevents the ingress of weeds. Its ability to fix atmospheric nitrogen enriches the soil and promotes the growth of the trees. Due to its persistence under shade, the plant can enrich a mixture of leguminous covers for young plantation trees. It is also used as an animal forage and is tolerant to heavy grazing.

References

hosei
Nitrogen-fixing crops
Taxa named by William Grant Craib